The Doosan Bears are a South Korean professional baseball team based in Seoul. Founded in 1982, they are a member of the KBO League. The Bears have won six Korean Series titles (1982, 1995, 2001, 2015, 2016, and 2019) and play their home games at Seoul's Jamsil Baseball Stadium.

History
OB Bears were the first team to be founded in the KBO League. In , the team moved to their current home in Seoul.

The Bears won the inaugural Korean Series in 1982 by defeating the Samsung Lions to become the first KBO League champion. Between 2015 and 2021, the Bears appeared in seven consecutive Korean Series championships, winning three of the series in 2015, 2016 and 2019.

Team colours 
The main colours of the team are navy and white, with red as the secondary colour. From 1999 to 2009, yellow was used instead as the secondary colour, before the team returned in 2010 to the iconic dark navy and red combination of the original OB Bears.

Mascot 
The Doosan Bears mascot is a bear named Cheol Woong (철웅).

Season-by-season records

Team

Current roster

Retired numbers 

The Bears have retired numbers 21 and 54. The number 21 is retired in honour of pitcher Park Chul-soon, who won the KBO League Most Valuable Player Award, the Pitching Triple Crown, and the Korean Series Most Valuable Player Award in 1982. The number 54 is in memory of catcher Kim Young-shin, who committed suicide while still a young player.

Managers

References
General

Specific

External links 

 Official website 
  
  

 
KBO League teams
Baseball teams established in 1982
Sport in Seoul
Bears
1982 establishments in South Korea